The Speaker of the Maryland House of Delegates presides as speaker over the House of Delegates in the state of Maryland in the United States.

List of speakers

Footnotes

References 
 Maryland State Archives - House of Delegates Records

External links 
 Maryland General Assembly

Speakers
Maryland